Nilesh Keshav Prabhudesai (born 13 May 1967 in Margao, Goa) is an Indian first-class cricketer who plays for Goa.

References

External links
 

1967 births
Living people
Indian cricketers
Goa cricketers
Cricketers from Goa